Kazakhstan–Mexico relations are the bilateral relations between Kazakhstan and Mexico. Both nations are members of the United Nations and the World Trade Organization.

History
Kazakhstan and Mexico formally established diplomatic relations on 14 January 1992, soon after the dissolution of the Soviet Union. Since then, there has been little diplomatic contact between both nations, with representatives of both nations meeting only at international forums such as at the United Nations.

In September 2014, Kazakh Foreign Minister Erlan Idrissov paid an official visit to Mexico, the highest visit ever paid to Mexico by a Kazakh official. During his visit, both nations announced plans to open resident embassies in each other's capitals, respectively. During Foreign Minister Idrissov's visit, he met with his Mexican counterpart Foreign Minister José Antonio Meade and held private meetings with the Secretary of the Economy Ildefonso Guajardo Villarreal, President of the Senate Miguel Barbosa Huerta and former President Vicente Fox.

Since the visit, both nations have increased cooperation in establishing mechanisms for their regions to become nuclear-free zones. In May 2015, a Russian rocket carrying a Mexican satellite was launched from Kazakhstan and crashed minutes afterwards due to technical issues. In 2016, Kazakhstan opened a resident embassy in Mexico City. In 2017, Mexico participated in the Expo 2017 being held in Astana. During the Expo, both nations also celebrated 25 years of diplomatic relations.

High-level visits
High-level visits from Kazakhstan to Mexico

 Foreign Minister Erlan Idrissov (2014)
 Foreign Vice Minister Yerzhan Ashikbayev (2015)

High-level visits from Mexico to Kazakhstan

 Foreign Undersecretary Carlos de Icaza González (2017)

Bilateral agreements
Both nations have signed a few bilateral agreements such as an Agreement to Abolish Visa Requirements for Official, Service and Diplomatic Passport (2014); Memorandum of Understanding on the Establishment of a Consultation Mechanism in the areas of Mutual Interests between the both Foreign Ministries of the countries (2014) and a Memorandum of Understanding in Cooperation between the Kazakh Academy of Public Administration and the Mexican Matias Romero Institute which prepares diplomats, and also adopted a joint statement reflecting bilateral issues and positions of the two countries on global issues (2014).

Trade
In 2018, bilateral trade between both nations amounted to US$23 million. Mexican exports to Kazakhstan include: metal pipes, electric motors and generators, medical equipment, air and vacuum pumps, tractors, cars and other motor vehicles, molybdenum ore, alcoholic beverages, food products and chemical products. Mexico is Kazakhstan's second biggest trading partner in Latin-America after Brazil.

Resident diplomatic missions
 Kazakhstan has an embassy in Mexico City.
 Mexico is accredited to Kazakhstan from its embassy in Ankara, Turkey and maintains an honorary consulate in Almaty.

See also 
 Foreign relations of Kazakhstan
 Foreign relations of Mexico

References

 
Mexico
Bilateral relations of Mexico